Tamirlan Omuraliyevich Kozubayev (born 1 July 1994) is a Kyrgyzstani professional footballer who currently plays as a centre back for Hong Kong Premier League club Eastern and the Kyrgyzstan national team.

Club career
Kozubayev previously played for FK Šiauliai and FK Granitas in Lithuanian A Lyga. On the last day of the 2015–16, winter transfers window, Kozubayev signed with the Serbian club FK Jagodina. After his Jagodina contract expired, Kozubayev signed a contract with Kyrgyz side Dordoi Bishkek on 17 August 2016.
On 28 January 2019, Dordoi Bishkek confirmed that Kozubayev had left the club after his contract had expired.

On 4 March 2022, Kozubayev signed for Hong Kong Premier League club Eastern.

International career
Kozubayev made his debut for Kyrgyzstan National Football Team in the 2018 FIFA World Cup Qualifiers, on 13 October 2015 against Bangladesh.

Career statistics

International

Statistics accurate as of match played 17 October 2017

International goals
Scores and results list Kyrgyzstan's goal tally first.

Honours
Dordoi Bishkek
Kyrgyz Premier League: 2018
Kyrgyzstan Cup: 2018

References 

1994 births
Living people
Sportspeople from Bishkek
Kyrgyzstan international footballers
Kyrgyzstani footballers
FC Dordoi Bishkek players
FK Klaipėdos Granitas players
FK Jagodina players
FC Šiauliai players
PKNS F.C. players
Persita Tangerang players
FC Shinnik Yaroslavl players
FC Turan players
Eastern Sports Club footballers
A Lyga players
Serbian SuperLiga players
Kyrgyz Premier League players
Malaysia Super League players
Liga 1 (Indonesia) players
Russian First League players
Kazakhstan Premier League players
Hong Kong Premier League players
Kyrgyzstani expatriate footballers
Kyrgyzstani expatriate sportspeople in Indonesia
Expatriate footballers in Lithuania
Kyrgyzstani expatriate sportspeople in Malaysia
Expatriate footballers in Serbia
Kyrgyzstani expatriate sportspeople in Serbia
Expatriate footballers in Malaysia
Expatriate footballers in Indonesia
Expatriate footballers in Russia
Kyrgyzstani expatriate sportspeople in Russia
Expatriate footballers in Kazakhstan
Kyrgyzstani expatriate sportspeople in Kazakhstan
Expatriate footballers in Hong Kong
Kyrgyzstani expatriate sportspeople in Hong Kong
Association football defenders
Footballers at the 2018 Asian Games
2019 AFC Asian Cup players
Asian Games competitors for Kyrgyzstan